Khebbashia is a clade of herbivorous sauropod dinosaurs belonging to the Rebbachisauridae. Members of Khebbashia were medium-sized sauropods from the early Cretaceous period of South America, Africa and Europe.

The name "Khebbashia" is derived from "Khebbash" or "Khebbache", a Moroccan tribe that inhabited the region where the first rebbachisaurid specimen was found in North Africa.

Khebbashia is defined as the least inclusive clade including Limaysaurus tessonei, Nigersaurus taqueti, and Rebbachisaurus garasbae. It therefore includes the rebbachisaurid subfamilies Rebbachisaurinae and Limaysaurinae, to the exclusion of more basal forms.

References

Rebbachisaurids